Assassins Pride is an anime series adapted from the light novel series, written by Kei Amagi and illustrated by Nino Ninomoto. Kazuya Aiura directed the series at EMT Squared with Deko Akao written the scripts, and Maho Yoshikawa designed the characters. It aired from October 10 to December 26, 2019 on AT-X, Tokyo MX, SUN, and BS NTV. The opening theme is "Share the light" performed by Run Girls, Run!, while the ending theme is  performed by Tomori Kusunoki. The series ran for 12 episodes. Sentai Filmworks has licensed the series and streamed it on Hidive and Crunchyroll. Hidive produced an English dub.


Episode List

Notes

References

Assassins Pride